22/7 may refer to:


The number  as an approximation of  
 Approximations of 
 Proof that  exceeds

Days of the year 
 July 22
 "Pi Approximation Day" or " Approximation Day"

People 
 22/7 (group), a Japanese idol group
 22/7 (TV series), Japanese anime series based on the Japanese idol group 22/7

See also 
 Pi
 2011 Norway attacks, referred to in Norway as 22 July or 22/7